Cook House is a historic home located at Parkersburg, Wood County, West Virginia.  It was built in 1825, and consists of a center section with two flanking wings in the Federal style. It is in a "T"-shaped plan, is built of red brick, and has a gable roof.

It was listed on the National Register of Historic Places in 1978.

References

Houses in Parkersburg, West Virginia
Houses on the National Register of Historic Places in West Virginia
Federal architecture in West Virginia
Houses completed in 1825
National Register of Historic Places in Wood County, West Virginia